Adrian Zaugg (born 4 November 1986 in Singapore) is a South African race car driver of Dutch descent.

Racing record

Complete Formula Renault 3.5 Series results
(key) (Races in bold indicate pole position) (Races in italics indicate fastest lap)

Complete A1 Grand Prix results
(key) (Races in bold indicate pole position) (Races in italics indicate fastest lap)

Complete GP2 Series results
(key) (Races in bold indicate pole position) (Races in italics indicate fastest lap)

References

External links
Zaugg's career details

1986 births
Living people
People from Singapore
South African people of Dutch descent
Coloured South African people
South African racing drivers
Formula BMW ADAC drivers
Italian Formula Renault 2.0 drivers
Formula Renault Eurocup drivers
A1 Team South Africa drivers
GP2 Series drivers
GP2 Asia Series drivers
Auto GP drivers
World Series Formula V8 3.5 drivers
Blancpain Endurance Series drivers
ADAC GT Masters drivers
24 Hours of Spa drivers
Super GT drivers
International GT Open drivers
Carlin racing drivers
Arden International drivers
A1 Grand Prix drivers
Emil Frey Racing drivers
Josef Kaufmann Racing drivers
Cram Competition drivers
Super Nova Racing drivers
Euronova Racing drivers
Asian Le Mans Series drivers
Target Racing drivers
Jenzer Motorsport drivers
Trident Racing drivers
DAMS drivers
Lamborghini Super Trofeo drivers